During the 1990–91 English football season, Derby County F.C. competed in the Football League First Division.

Season summary
In the 1990–91 season, the Rams endured an even worse season than the one before. Between December 1990 and April 1991, Derby went a club record 20 games without a win and equalled the worst ever home league defeat when they crashed 7–1 at home to Liverpool. Gates dropped to 11,000 from an opening match crowd of 18,011 against Sheffield United and the team looked a shadow of the one that had finished fifth two years before as they were relegated and finished bottom of the table with just 5 wins and 24 points from 38 games, a massive 13 points from safety.

Final league table

 Pld = Matches ; W = Matches won; D = Matches drawn; L = Matches lost; F = Goals for; A = Goals against; GD = Goal difference; Pts = Points
Arsenal deducted two points; Manchester United deducted one point due to a brawl in a game between both teams.

Results summary

Results by round

Results
Derby County's score comes first

Legend

Football League First Division

FA Cup

League Cup

Full Members Cup

Squad

Transfers

In

Out

Transfers in:  £0
Transfers out:  £745,000
Total spending:  £745,000

References

Derby County F.C. seasons
Derby County